Eric Butorac and Scott Lipsky were the defending champions, but Butorac chose to participate in Barcelona instead.Lipsky partnered up with David Martin, but they lost in the first round against Robert Kendrick and Bobby Reynolds.Stephen Huss and Joseph Sirianni won in the final 6–2, 6–4 against Robert Kendrick and Bobby Reynolds

Seeds

Draw

Draw

References
 Doubles Draw
 Qualifying Doubles Draw

Tallahassee Tennis Challenger - Doubles
2010 Doubles